In military terms, 103rd Regiment may refer to:

Infantry regiments
 103rd Regiment of Foot (disambiguation), several units of the British Army
 103rd Regiment (Calgary Rifles), a unit of the Canadian non-permanent militia
 103rd Indiana Infantry Regiment, a unit of the Union Army
 103rd Ohio Infantry, a unit of the Union Army
 103rd Infantry Regiment (United States)

Other regiments
 103rd Armor Regiment, a unit of the Pennsylvania National Guard
 103rd Cavalry Regiment, a former unit of the Pennsylvania National Guard
 103rd Field Artillery Regiment, a unit of the United States Army
 103rd (Lancashire Artillery Volunteers) Regiment Royal Artillery

See also
 103rd Division (disambiguation)